The 2009 NERFU college men's Division III rugby union tournament featured eight teams from four conferences.  The top two teams in each conference were seeded according to the success of their conference in the previous year.  

Plymouth State University beat Furman in the finals of the '08 Division 3 championship held at Hamilton college in New York. 

In an outstanding championship match at the Kirwin Memorial Pitch at Fort Adams in Newport, Rhode Island, newcomer Salve Regina University defeated Southern Connecticut State University by a score of 21–20.  The match was attended by over 500 fans.

Cup championship bracket

2008 regular season 
The 2008 regular season was played in September and October.  Each team played 5 conference opponents, with the top 2 finishers qualifying for the NERFU championship.

At the end of the regular season, the four conference champs (Salve Regina, Saint Anselm, Southern Connecticut, and Keene State) met the four conference runners-up (UMASS Dartmouth, Tufts, Western Connecticut and defending national champion Plymouth State) in the NERFU quarterfinals.

2008 regular-season standings 
Central Conference
Conference Champion: Salve Regina University

East Conference
Conference Champion: Saint Anselm College

South Conference
Conference Champion: Southern Connecticut State University

West Conference
Conference Champion: Keene State College

References

NERFU College Men's Rugby Union Tournaments
NERFU
NERFU